Sahibzadi Asma Hussain (born Lucknow, India) is an Indian fashion designer.

She belongs to the Royal family of Awadh and is a descendant of Shuja-ud-Daula.

Asma Hussain displayed her first collection in 1994, and founded the Asma Hussain Institute of Fashion Technology (AIFT) in Uttar Pradesh in the same year. The institute is recognised by the Government of India's National Council for Vocational Training.

Hussain is the Chairperson and Managing Director of the Youth Upliftment and Welfare Association (YUWA), an NGO. She also has a designer outlet in Lucknow, the Asma Hussain Fashion House (AHFH).

She is part of FDCI, Wills India fashion Week, a council of designers in India.

Personal life
Asma Hussain studied at Aligarh Muslim University. She is married to Anis Ansari and has two daughters, Amira Husain & Naila Ansari.

Career

Asma Hussain Institute of Fashion Technology (AIFT)
The Asma Hussain Institute of Fashion Technology was established in 1995 and inaugurated by Motilal Vora, the governor of Uttar Pradesh. It is an autonomous non-governmental organisation registered under the Societies Registration Act.

Asma Hussain has organised a number of fashion shows in the name of her institute, including "Nazakat" for IAS week 1998, "Costumes of Avadh" for the Lucknow club and the Uttar Pradesh Khadi & Village industry board. A two-day fashion festival in 1997 was also organized by her at Jahangirabad Palace.

Asma Hussain Fashion House

The Fashion House is a retail design outlet for handicrafts and ensembles of Uttar Pradesh and other regions. It has a manufacturing unit for Zari Zardozi, Chikan work, Mukaish, Appliqué and Tailored garments.	
Students at the AIFT showcase their work in the studio as a part of the practical learning process.

References

External links
 Official website
 Suspended official reinstated in Lucknow

1967 births
Indian Muslims
Living people
Businesspeople from Lucknow
Indian women fashion designers
Aligarh Muslim University alumni
Artists from Lucknow
Women artists from Uttar Pradesh
Businesswomen from Uttar Pradesh